The 2012–13 PlusLiga was the 77th season of the Polish Volleyball Championship, the 13th season as a professional league organized by the Professional Volleyball League SA under the supervision of the Polish Volleyball Federation.

Asseco Resovia won their 6th title of the Polish Champions.

Regular season

|}

Playoffs

1st round
Quarterfinals
(to 3 victories)

|}

|}

|}

|}

2nd round
Semifinals
(to 3 victories)

|}

|}

5th–8th places
(to 2 victories)

|}

|}

3rd round
9th place
(to 3 victories)

|}

5th place
(to 3 victories)

|}

3rd place
(to 3 victories)

|}

Finals
(to 3 victories)

|}

Final standings

References

External links
 Official website 

PlusLiga
PlusLiga
PlusLiga
PlusLiga
PlusLiga